Manuel Elias Acta (born January 11, 1969) is a Dominican former professional baseball manager who is currently the third base coach for the Seattle Mariners, and formerly a broadcast analyst for ESPN and ESPN Deportes. He has served as manager for the Washington Nationals and the Cleveland Indians of Major League Baseball.

In the Dominican Winter League, he is currently the general manager of the Estrellas Orientales. He managed the Tigres del Licey from 2003–2005, including leading them to victory at the 2004 Caribbean Series. Acta managed the Dominican Republic team at the 2006 World Baseball Classic where they placed 4th.

Playing career

Houston Astros
Acta was signed by the Houston Astros at age 17 as an undrafted free agent infielder. Acta played baseball professionally for six seasons, all in the Astros' system, but never reached the major leagues as a player. The Astros organization would eventually send him to scouting school in Florida to utilize his analytical skills rather than his athletic talent.

Coaching career

Minor leagues
In 1991, Acta became a player-coach at the A level, and soon after that quit his playing career and focused solely on coaching. He became the manager of the A-level Auburn Astros team at Auburn, New York in 1993, and he managed in the minors through 2000. He led the Kissimmee Cobras to a Florida State League championship in 1999.

Montreal Expos
Acta was hired as the third base coach for the Montreal Expos under Frank Robinson in 2002, and held that position through 2005.

New York Mets
In 2005 Acta was hired as the third base coach for the New York Mets under manager Willie Randolph. He held this position for two years, leaving to become the manager of the Washington Nationals.

Seattle Mariners
On November 9, 2015, Acta was hired as the third base coach for the Seattle Mariners under new manager Scott Servais for the 2016 season. Acta was the first person issued #14 as it had been out of circulation since Lou Piniella left the team after the 2002 season.

Managerial career

Washington Nationals

Acta was hired as manager of the Washington Nationals on November 14, 2006, returning to the franchise that gave him his first major league job (the Nationals were the Expos prior to a relocation following the 2004 season). Acta received the job for his youth and enthusiasm, as well as knowing a few of the Nationals players from his third base coaching job with the Expos. In his first season with Washington, projected to be one of the worst teams in Major League Baseball, Acta and the Nationals finished 73–89. With his team beset by many injuries—on Opening Day, he lost starting shortstop Cristian Guzman and center fielder Nook Logan for five weeks and by June, four of his five starting pitchers were on the disabled list—Acta maintained a positive influence on his young Nationals. In his first year with the Nationals he earned votes for NL Manager of the Year, coming in fifth in that vote. In his second season managing the Nats, the team's record worsened to 59–102. Signs of the team progressing in the win column was not being realized during the beginning of his third season with the club. At 26–61, and the Nats coming off a 100-loss season, including a seven-game road trip in which they would win just one game, Acta's time as manager was drawing to a close.

On July 12, 2009, Acta reported he had been fired as Nationals manager following a loss to the Houston Astros. The Nationals announced on their website on July 13 that an announcement concerning the dismissal was forthcoming, which served as a confirmation of the firing. Nationals bench coach Jim Riggleman, who had previously managed the San Diego Padres, Chicago Cubs, and Seattle Mariners, assumed the position as interim manager.

Cleveland Indians
On October 25, 2009, the Cleveland Indians announced that they had hired Acta as their manager, signing him to a three-year contract with an option for an additional year. The Astros had also offered Acta their managerial position. The Indians struggled in his first year, marginally improving from their 2009 campaign at 69–93. In his second season, the Indians improved by 11 games to 80–82 after starting out the season 30–15. Cleveland would finish in second place, fifteen games behind the Detroit Tigers. On September 29, 2011, the Indians announced they had exercised Acta's option for the 2013 season.

After a 20–51 record in the second half of the 2012 season, the Indians fired Acta on September 27, 2012 with only six games remaining in the regular season. Bench coach Sandy Alomar Jr. was named interim manager and Terry Francona eventually was named to the position full-time.

Seattle Mariners 
Acta served as interim manager for 2 games in May 2018 as regular manager Scott Servais was gone to attend his daughter's college graduation.

Managerial record

Personal life
Acta comes from a family of Lebanese descent that settled in San Pedro de Macorís a century ago.

The fatal plane crash on October 11, 2006, that killed New York Yankees pitcher Cory Lidle and his pilot crashed into Acta's apartment building in New York while he was still coaching for the Mets. Acta wasn't there at the time because he had gone to Shea Stadium to prepare for that night's Game 1 of the NLCS between the Mets and St. Louis Cardinals.

His ImpACTA Kids Foundation has raised a significant amount of awareness and donations in providing children with the opportunities to achieve their dreams. As of 2010, the ImpACTA Kids Foundation has awarded $5,000 in college scholarships in the United States and neared completion of an athletic/education youth complex in Consuelo, Dominican Republic.

See also

 List of Cleveland Guardians managers

References

External links

Manny Acta profile provided by mwlguide.com
Column by Tim Brown provided by Yahoo! Sports

1969 births
Living people
Burlington Astros players
Dominican Republic baseball coaches
Dominican Republic expatriate baseball people in Canada
Dominican Republic expatriate baseball players in the United States
Dominican Republic national baseball team managers
Dominican Republic people of Lebanese descent
Sportspeople of Lebanese descent
Cleveland Indians managers
Columbus Mudcats players
Gulf Coast Astros players
Major League Baseball broadcasters
Major League Baseball third base coaches
Minor league baseball managers
Montreal Expos coaches
New York Mets coaches
Osceola Astros players
Seattle Mariners coaches
Sportspeople from San Pedro de Macorís
Washington Nationals managers
White Dominicans